Woodside Bible Church is a non-denominational Christian megachurch based in Troy, Michigan. It is a multi-site church with 15 locations in the Detroit Metro area, with a total weekly attendance of over 9,000. In 2015, Woodside Bible was listed as the 48th largest church in America, and the 56th fastest growing church by Outreach Magazine.
It is considered to be "one of the nation's fastest-growing congregations". The church is led by Pastor Chris Brooks, who has served as the church's senior pastor since May 2019.

History
Originally named Big Beaver Baptist, the church was founded in 1955, by Rev. Harold Moran and a few families who would hold meetings in homes in the Troy, Michigan area. A converted home was purchased the same year at 3193 Rochester Rd. The church remained at this address until 2005. In 1962, the name was changed to Troy Baptist Church. Larger auditoriums were built on the property in 1973 and 1980. The name was changed to Woodside Bible Church in 2002, and moved to the current location in 2005. In July 2005, Woodside celebrated their 50th Anniversary as a church and, in September of that same year, merged with Redeemer Baptist Church in Warren, Michigan creating the second Woodside location. Woodside has since added another 13 locations in the following years. In May 2019, Pastor Doug Schmidt retired and was succeeded by Pastor Chris Brooks.

In 2010 Pastor Doug Schmidt joined with others to form The Evangelical Pastors Network, a group which provides inspiration and assistance for evangelical pastors.

Additionally, Ravi Zacharias spoke at the Troy Woodside campus in late 2010, addressing The Evangelical Pastors Network.

References

External links
Official site
City of Troy, Michigan: proclamation of Woodside Bible's 50th Anniversary
 www.woodside.tv

Evangelical churches in Michigan
Evangelical megachurches in the United States
Churches in Oakland County, Michigan
Christian organizations established in 1955
1955 establishments in Michigan